Eleanore A. Cronk is a justice of the Court of Appeal for Ontario in Canada. Cronk is a graduate of the University of Windsor Faculty of Law. She had also previously been chair of the Canadian Bar Association National Task Force on Systems of Civil Justice.

References

Living people
Justices of the Court of Appeal for Ontario
University of Windsor Faculty of Law alumni
Year of birth missing (living people)
Place of birth missing (living people)
Canadian women judges